Algapur (Pron:/ˈalɡəˈpʊə/) is a town and Tehsil or Block in Hailakandi district  in the state of Assam, India. It is located 32 km  from District headquarters Hailakandi.

Geography
It has an average elevation of 25 metres (82 feet).

Politics
Algapur is part of Karimganj (Lok Sabha constituency).

References

Cities and towns in Hailakandi district
Hailakandi